Sphaeromatidea is a suborder of isopod crustaceans.

Families 

The suborder contains seven extant and three extinct families in two superfamilies:

Sphaeromatidea
Archaeoniscidae?
Seroloidea 
Basserolidae 
Bathynataliidae 
Plakarthriidae 
Schweglerellidae  
Serolidae 
Tricarinidae 
Sphaeromatoidea 
Ancinidae 
Sphaeromatidae 
Tecticipitidae

References

 
Isopoda
Arthropod suborders